The Ozark shiner (Notropis ozarcanus) is a species of freshwater cyprinid fish endemic to the United States where it is found in the Ozark Uplands in southern Missouri and northern Arkansas, inhabiting the White and Black river systems.

References 

 

Ozark shiner
Endemic fauna of the United States
Fish of the Eastern United States
Freshwater fish of the United States
Ozark shiner
Ozark shiner
Ozark shiner
White River (Arkansas–Missouri)